Westport is the name of several communities around the world.

Canada
Westport, Nova Scotia
Westport, Ontario
Westport Rideaus, local junior "B" ice hockey team
Westport/Rideau Lakes Airport
Westport, Newfoundland and Labrador

Ireland
Westport, County Mayo
Westport House
Westport railway station, Mayo
Westport United F.C., football club
Westport CFE – Carrowbeg College

Malaysia
West Port, Malaysia

New Zealand
Westport, New Zealand
Westport News
Westport Airport (New Zealand)
Westport Rugby Football Club

United Kingdom
Westport, Somerset
Westport Canal
Westport, Wiltshire

United States
Westport, California
Westport, Connecticut
Westport Country Playhouse, a theatre
Westport (Metro-North station)
Westport Bank and Trust Company, a historic place
Westport Public Library
Westport, Indiana
Westport Township, Dickinson County, Iowa
Westport, Kentucky, in Oldham Co.
Westport High School (Kentucky), in Louisville, named for the Westport Road
Westport Island, Maine
Westport Community Church
Westport, Baltimore, Maryland
Westport (Baltimore Light Rail station)
Westport, Massachusetts
Westport High School (Massachusetts)
Westport River in Massachusetts
Westport Point Historic District
Westport Town Farm
Westport, Minnesota
Westport Township, Pope County, Minnesota
Westport, Kansas City, a historic district of Kansas City, Missouri
Westport High School (Missouri)
Westport Middle School
Westport Plaza, a resort and entertainment center in Maryland Heights, Missouri
Westport, New York, a town
Westport (CDP), New York, a hamlet in the town
Westport (Amtrak station)
Westport, North Carolina
Westport, Oklahoma
Westport, Oregon
Westport, Pennsylvania
Westport, South Dakota
Westport, Tennessee
Westport, Washington
Westport Light State Park
Westport, Wisconsin
Westport, Richland County, Wisconsin

Other uses
Westport Records, a record label
Westport Innovations, an international company headquartered in Vancouver, Canada
, the name of more than one United States Navy ship
, the name of a number of merchant ships
CCGS Westport, a Canadian Coast Guard search and rescue vessel
Battle of Westport, 1864, in what is now Kansas City, Missouri

See also
West Port (disambiguation)
Westport Airport (disambiguation)
Irish place names in other countries